"Die a Happy Man" is a song co-written and recorded by American country music singer Thomas Rhett. It was released on September 28, 2015, by Valory Music Group as the second single from his second studio album, Tangled Up. Rhett wrote the song with Sean Douglas and Joe Spargur. American singer Tori Kelly is featured on a pop remix included on the deluxe edition. The song peaked at number 21 on the US Billboard Hot 100, becoming his highest-charting single on that chart.

Reception

Critical
Billy Dukes of Taste of Country reviewed the song favorably, saying that "Thomas Rhett may have just released the love song of the year. "Die a Happy Man" is a slow burner that melts like candle wax. With just a few pulls from a blues-soaked guitar, the mood is set for this increasingly dynamic singer to heat up any room."

Commercial
On the week of its release, the song debuted at number 17 on the Hot Country Songs chart, number 92 on the Billboard Hot 100 and number 41 on the Country Airplay chart, with 40,000 copies sold for the week. The second week, it rose to number 30 on the Country Airplay chart, and sold 33,000 copies. It reached number one on the Country Digital Songs chart in its third week, selling 39,000 copies. It topped the Hot Country Songs chart in its sixth week, and then topped the Country Airplay chart in January 2016, staying at number one on all three country charts simultaneously for multiple weeks. On the Country Airplay chart for the week of January 30, 2016, the song logged its fifth consecutive week at number one, making it the first song to spend more than four weeks at number one since Lady Antebellum's "Need You Now" stayed at the top for five weeks in 2009, and the first song by a solo male artist to spend five weeks at the top since Kenny Chesney's "Never Wanted Nothing More" in August 2007. The following week, it topped the Country Airplay chart for a sixth and final week, becoming the first song to spend six weeks at number one since Taylor Swift's "Our Song" in December 2007 – January 2008. It peaked at number 21 on the Hot 100 for the week of January 2, 2016.

The single was certified 2× Platinum on May 18, 2016, 3× Platinum on February 21, 2017 and by August 2021 was certified 7× Platinum. The single reached the one million download sales in February 2016. As of September 2017, "Die a Happy Man" had sold 1,914,000 downloads.

Music video
The music video was directed by TK McKamy and produced by Dan Atchison. The video was shot on location on the North Shore of Oahu in Hawaii at the same time as his video for "Vacation". It premiered in June 2015. Rhett's wife, Lauren, appears in the video.

Chart performance
"Die a Happy Man" topped the Hot Country Songs chart on November 14, 2015. The song remained on top for seventeen weeks before being knocked off by "You Should Be Here" performed by Cole Swindell.

Thomas Rhett version

Year-end charts

Decade-end charts

All-time charts

Certifications

Nelly version

"Die a Happy Man" was covered by American rapper Nelly in 2016 and released as a single on February 5, 2016 by RECORDS and Epic Records. His version draws inspiration from hip hop music and dance music and employs synthesizers.

Commercial performance 
His version debuted at number 83 on the Billboard Hot 100 with first-week US sales of 35,000.

Track listing 
Digital download
"Die a Happy Man" — 3:34

Charts

Awards and nominations

References

2015 songs
2015 singles
Country ballads
2010s ballads
Thomas Rhett songs
Big Machine Records singles
Republic Records singles
Epic Records singles
Songs written by Thomas Rhett
Song recordings produced by Dann Huff
Music videos directed by TK McKamy
Songs written by Sean Douglas (songwriter)
Nelly songs
2016 singles
Songs written by Joe London
Pop ballads